Juanita Quigley (24 June 1931 – 29 October 2017) was an American child actress in motion pictures of the 1930s and 1940s. She had a sister, Rita Quigley, who was also a child actress.

Career
Juanita Quigley was billed as "Baby Jane" in several early roles. Her screen debut was as Claudette Colbert's three-year-old daughter in Imitation of Life (1934). She went on to play featured parts in several films, including The Man Who Reclaimed His Head (1934) and was Jean Harlow's niece in Riffraff (1936). Quigley became a familiar face to moviegoers of the era, but major roles for children so young were few and she often played bits as well as featured roles. She was one of the most popular child stars of her day, and was Universal Pictures' youngest star in 1934.

Quigley was briefly involved in the Our Gang film series. In 1940, she was the guest-starring lead in The New Pupil when cast as Sally, who briefly takes "Alfalfa" (played by Carl Switzer) away from Darla Hood. Two years later, she reprised the character in Going to Press (1942), the only time in the MGM era where the female lead was played by someone other than Darla Hood (who had recently left the series) or Janet Burston.

Quigley acted alongside her older sister, Rita Quigley, in  Whispering Footsteps (1943). Her last major role was in National Velvet (1944), in which she played Elizabeth Taylor's sister.

Later career
Quigley made only a handful of small appearances after National Velvet, her last being in 1950. At the age of 20, in August 1951, she became a Catholic religious sister,  Sister Quentin Rita in the order of the Daughters of Mary and Joseph, teaching at Precious Blood Catholic School. After several years in her convent, she left the vocation and married Dr. Donald Robert Schultz in 1964. The couple had two children, Erik and Marta, before his death in 2012.

Inaccurate documentation exists that Juanita made an uncredited appearance as an extra in the locally filmed Porky's II: The Next Day.

Juanita Quigley died in Sudbury, Massachusetts, on 29 October 2017, aged 86. She and her husband Donald R. Schultz (1927–2012) are buried at the National Memorial Cemetery of Arizona in Phoenix.

Filmography

References

Bibliography
 Willson, Dixie (1935). Little Hollywood Stars. Akron, OH, and New York: Saalfield Pub. Co.

External links
 

1931 births
2017 deaths
Actresses from Los Angeles
American child actresses
American film actresses
Burials in Arizona
20th-century American actresses
20th-century American Roman Catholic nuns
21st-century American women